Bicycle Wheel is a readymade from Marcel Duchamp consisting of a bicycle fork with front wheel mounted upside-down on a wooden stool.

In 1913 at his Paris studio Duchamp mounted the bicycle wheel upside down onto a stool, spinning it occasionally just to watch it. Later he denied that its creation was purposeful, though it has come to be known as the first of his readymades. "I enjoyed looking at it", he said, "just as I enjoy looking at the flames dancing in the fireplace". It was not until he began making readymades a few years later in New York that he decided Bicycle Wheel was also a readymade, and created the second version.

The original version of 1913 and the second version of 1916-17 were both lost. Duchamp recreated yet another version of the sculpture in 1951. 
Bicycle Wheel is said to be the first kinetic sculpture.

See also
Found object
Lumino kinetic art
Readymades of Marcel Duchamp

References

External links

  Bicycle Wheel in the MoMA Online Collection
  Kinetic Bicycle Wheel Hommage a Duchamp, Tinguely, et Ganson (videos)
  Flash version of the wheel by Rafaël Rozendaal
  Too close to duchamp's bicycle by Les Liens Invisibles

Marcel Duchamp works
Modernist sculpture
Found object
1913 sculptures
Sculptures of the Museum of Modern Art (New York City)
Lost sculptures
Kinetic art
Bicycles in art
Bicycle wheels
Kinetic sculptures in the United States